The men's half marathon at the 2013 Summer Universiade was held on July 12, 2013.

Medalists

Individual

Team

Results

Individual standing

Team standing

References
Results
Team medalists
Team ranking

Half
2013